MYtv provides satellite pay-TV services throughout Ukraine.

History

MYtv is a DTH (Direct to Home) satellite television network for the Ukrainian TV consumer market.  Using its transmitting antenna, the signal is sent to the Thor 6 satellite, broadcast standard DVB-S2 (MPEG4), which caters for the optimum quality and utilization  of the satellite’s capacity.

NDS Ltd. encrypts  the signal, and also develops the software for the headend station and the end user equipment.  To receive MYtv services, subscriber must install a satellite dish. 
Installing  either 1 or 2 or 3 or 4  LNB (converters), a subscriber will receive signals from satellites Thor 6 (1 ° W) and few other satellites including W4 (36° E), Hotbird (13 ° E), Sirius (5 ° E), Amos (4 ° W).

MYtv  offers 2 subscriber receivers: MYtv  HDMAX and MYtv HDBOX.

MYtv HDMAX is an HD receiver with a built-in hard drive capacity of 500 GB.  With the Interactive electronic program guide (EPG) the receiver can record and play programs and create video libraries, record all series in full seasons, skip watching advertisements in channels etc.  The "live pause" feature enables you to stop viewing for an indefinite period and resume from the moment of the pause. 
MYtv HDMAX has two built-in receivers, which enables the simultaneously recording of two channels and watching programs from hard drive.  The receiver hardware and software can record a channel even if the receiver is turned off.  It is enough to note the program from the EPG list.

The Satellite HD-receivers MYtv HDMAX and HDBOX

The  receiver MYtv HDMAX is a new generation of receivers, which combines the possibility of receiving high-definition television and an advanced recording function (up to 500 hours of recording), listening to stereo sound, as well as a number of additional services.

MYtv provides access to over 200 channels, selected according to different themes: movies, news, politics, music, sports, art, travel, science channels "for children" and "adult" and other TV channels. Also, MYtv software allow access to free access broadcast channels (FTA).

Specially developed NDS software built into the receiver, allows the viewer to take advantage of additional services:

Electronic Program Guides (EPG program guide) displays the following information: the date, time of the show and the content of the television programs on the TV screen.  . Also, it can block channels and programs from children's viewing. EPG enables the selection of the broadcasting language required as well as titles.

Personal video recorder (PVR) allows the receiver to be used as a recording device. You can save movies and create your own video collection. If you wish to stop the viewing of the current program or movie, press “pause” and to continue the viewing press “pause” again.  Using the program guide, you can automatically record programs or whole series even when you are not at home.

Interactive television (ITV) is a new service catering for interactive games, TV questioning, on-air communication of programs, using the mail or SMS, predefined ability to receive news, play individual and network games. The viewer controls the set of services provided as he wishes and can subscribe to different packages of interactive channels.

With Pay-per-view (PPV) you have the possibility of independently choosing a movie or program and then watch them at a time convenient to you. Using the EPG menu, you can see the announcement, time of the show and various methods of payment.

With P-VOD (video and audio on demand), you can independently choose the movies, TV programs and concerts which you wish to view immediately, without any time limit date and number of viewings.

Radio – You can always tune in and listen to the radio using your receiver.
 Official MYtv web-site - www.mytv.ua

Television companies of Ukraine